Francesca Gargallo (25 November 1956 – 3 March 2022) was a Sicilian-born Mexican writer and poet.

Life and career
Born in Syracuse, Italy as Francesca Gargallo di Castel Lentini Celentani, she studied philosophy at the Università degli studi di Roma and then at the National Autonomous University of Mexico (UNAM). A naturalized Mexican citizen, she lived in the country since 1979. She wrote many poetry books and novels such as; Calla mi amor que vivo, Estar en el mundo, La decisión del capitán, Marcha seca among others. Gargallo published work in magazines such as Proceso. Gargallo died of cancer on 3 March 2022, aged 65.

Selected works
 Al paso de los días, Editorial Terracota, Ciudad de México, 2013
 Marcha seca, Ediciones Era, México, 1999, 76 pp. 
 La decisión del capitán, Ediciones Era, México, 1997, 181 pp. .
 Los pescadores del Kukulkán, Aldus, México, 1995, 67 pp. .
 Estar en el mundo, Ediciones Era, México, 1994, 135 pp. .
 Calla mi amor que vivo, Ediciones Era, México, 1990, 147 pp. .
 Días sin Casura, Leega Literaria, México, 1986, 90 pp. .
 Días sin Casura, edición digital de Ars Longa, México, 2011, ISBN digital: 6326

References

External links

1956 births
2022 deaths
20th-century Mexican novelists
20th-century Mexican philosophers
20th-century Mexican poets
20th-century Mexican women writers
Mexican women novelists
Mexican women poets
National Autonomous University of Mexico alumni
Italian emigrants to Mexico
Mexican people of Sicilian descent
Mexican women philosophers
People from Syracuse, Sicily
Deaths from cancer in Mexico